Franz Xaver Anton Murschhauser (1 July 1663 – 6 January 1738) was a German composer and theorist.

He was born in Saverne, Alsace, but he is first mentioned as a singer and instrumentalist at St Peter's School in Munich, in 1676. He studied music with the Kantor, Siegmund Auer and, from 1683 to his death in 1693, Johann Caspar Kerll. Murchhauser was appointed music director of the Munich Frauenkirche in 1691, where he remained until his death.

Works
He published two collections of organ music in the tradition of the South German school, intended for use with the Catholic liturgy; these consist of short toccatas, fantasies and fugues written using the psalm tones and plainchant melodies.

The first collection is entitled Octi-tonium novum organicum, octo tonis ecclesiasticis, ad Psalmos, & magnificat (Augsburg, 1696), and contains 89 pieces.

The second collection is in two parts of 34 pieces each, entitled Prototypon longo-breve organicum; (part I, Nuremberg, 1703; part II, Nuremberg, 1707). Both may be found in Denkmäler der Tonkunst in Bayern XXX, Jg.xviii (1917).

There are other keyboard works in the Österreichische Nationalbibliothek, Vienna, and the Sing-Akademie zu Berlin. A surviving accompanied vocal work, Vespertinus latriae et hyperduliae cultus (Ulm, 1700), contains ten psalms and one laudate.

He also published two works on the subject of music theory, designed for instruction in the art of composition: Fundamentalische kurz- und bequeme Handleitung sowohl zur Figural als Choral Music (Munich, 1707), and Academia musico-poetica bipartita, oder Hohe Schul der musicalischen Compositions, part I [there is no part II] (Nuremberg, 1721). These treatises are conservative and distinctly 'old-fashioned' in their treatment of the subject, and were strongly attacked by Johann Mattheson in his Critica musica due to their firmly being founded on the contrapuntal practice of late-16th century sacred music, while Mattheson was in favour of the 'modern', Italian opera-influenced style.

Media

Sources
George J. Buelow, 'Murschhauser, Franz Xaver', Grove Music Online ed. L. Macy (Accessed 2007-06-10), http://www.grovemusic.com/

External links

1663 births
1738 deaths
People from Saverne
German Baroque composers
Organists and composers in the South German tradition
German male organists
German music theorists
18th-century keyboardists
18th-century classical composers
German classical composers
German male classical composers
18th-century German composers
18th-century German male musicians
Male classical organists